Centro Asturiano de México (formerly Club Asturias) is a Mexican sports club located in the Mexico D.F. Their football club played in the Liga Mexicana de Football Amateur Association, the first and main league prior to the professionalization and development of the Primera División de México in 1943.

Although it was established as a football institution, Centro Asturiano hosts a large variety of activities, with badminton, basketball, bolo palma, golf, scuba diving, paddle tennis, squash, swimming, taekwondo, tennis and volleyball among them.

History

The club was established as "Club Asturias" on 7 February 1918 when a group of Asturian immigrants made up by José Menéndez Aleu, Ángel H. Díaz and Antonio Martínez got together and decided to establish a football club that would represent their Asturian heritage.

The main goal was to unite all the Spaniards who had emigrated from Asturias to Mexico, and so imitatively the club enrolled into the Primera Fuerza. Asturias would play in the league from 1919 to 1943, winning two titles in 1922–23 and 1938–39.

When a professional league, Mexican Primera División was created, Asturias was also part of the new league, winning its third title in 1943–44 (and the first professional ever) but the club decided to disaffiliate in 1950, being the last senior championship played by Asturias up to present days.

See also
 Asturias F.C.
 Asturians

References

External links
Official website

1918 establishments in Mexico
Asturian diaspora
Multi-sport clubs in Mexico
Diaspora sports clubs
Spanish-Mexican culture
Association football clubs established in 1918